Mecynippus is a genus of longhorn beetles of the subfamily Lamiinae, containing the following species:

 Mecynippus ciliatus (Gahan, 1888)
 Mecynippus pubicornis Bates, 1884

References

Lamiini